In mathematics, the fundamental theorem of linear algebra is a collection of statements regarding vector spaces and linear algebra, popularized by Gilbert Strang. The naming of these results is not universally accepted.

More precisely, let  be a linear map between two finite-dimensional vector spaces, represented by a  matrix  of rank , then:
It follows that one has also:

The two first assertions are also called the rank–nullity theorem.

References
 Strang, Gilbert. Linear Algebra and Its Applications. 3rd ed. Orlando: Saunders, 1988.

External links

, MIT Linear Algebra Lecture on the Four Fundamental Subspaces, from MIT OpenCourseWare

Theorems in linear algebra
Isomorphism theorems